Leandra Rodrigues Leal Braz e Silva (born 8 September 1982) is a Brazilian actress, singer, film director, producer, and playwright.

Biography 
She is the granddaughter of the cultural producer Américo Leal and daughter of actress Ângela Leal. She started in drama at the age of seven, and eight on television, when she participated in the last chapter of the soap opera Pantanal, in which her mother also worked. An only child, one may assume she was influenced by her mother in her career choice, because since she was a little girl she has been living among artists and was fascinated by the art of interpretation.

In 2000 she co-starred in the miniseries A Muralha and then the soap opera O Cravo e a Rosa, emerging in both rather prominently. In 2002, she participated in the Pastores da Noite miniseries, and in 2002, she was present in a season of children's series Sítio do Picapau Amarelo. She also came to participate in some episodes of A Grande Família, as Viviane, one of Tuco's girlfriends.

In 2004, she acted in the soap opera Senhora do Destino, gaining the sympathy of the audience by clashing with the villain Nazaré, played by Renata Sorrah. Later that year, she also acted in the film Cazuza - O Tempo Não Pára, as Bebel, singer's best friend.

In 2008, she co-starred in the remake of Ciranda de Pedra as Elzinha. At the end of the year, she debuted as a director in the Mercadorias e Futuro goods and theatrical spectacle, with José Paes de Lira.

She is the flagship holder of the largest block of Carnival in Rio de Janeiro, the Cordão do Bola Preta.

In 2011, she was part of the cast of the film Estamos Juntos, participated in the last chapter of the soap opera Insensato Coração, and also participated of a framework called the Fantástico, A História do Amor, in which she played 64 different characters on the side the actor Daniel de Oliveira.

In 2012, she was in the episode "A Sexóloga de Floripa" in series As Brasileiras. And the soap opera is Cheias de Charme, playing Maria do Rosário. In 2013 was cast in the remake of Saramandaia, which give life to veterinary Zélia, one of the central characters of trama.

Works

Television

Films

Awards and nominations

Biarritz International Festival of Latin American Cinema

Brazilian Film Festival of Miami

Troféu APCA

Rio de Janeiro International Film Festival

South by Southwest

Toronto International Film Festival

Lisbon Gay & Lesbian Film Festival

Fénix Awards

Lleida Latin-American Film Festival

Elcine

Marseille Festival of Documentary Film

Platino Awards

Festival de Gramado

Film Festival of Portuguese Speaking Countries

SESC Movie Festival

Unibanco Station Award

Fiesp/Sesi Cinema Award

Aruanda Festival of Brazilian Audiovisual

Cuiabá Film and Video Festival

Natal Film and Video Festival

Recife Film and Video Festival

Melhores do Ano

Prêmio Contigo! de Tv

Grande Prêmio do Cinema Brasileiro

Quality Award Brazil

Guarani Brazilian Film Award

Making Difference Award - O Globo

Tiradentes Film Festival

ACIE Film Festival

Extra Television Award

Quem Television Award

My Awards Nick

Singles

References

External links 

1982 births
Living people
Brazilian film actresses
Brazilian stage actresses
Brazilian television actresses
Actresses from Rio de Janeiro (city)